A by-election was held for the South Australian House of Assembly seat of Elizabeth on 9 April 1994. This was triggered by the resignation of former state Labor MHA Martyn Evans, who moved to the federal seat of Bonython at the 1994 by-election. The seat, created at the 1969 redistribution and first contested at the 1970 state election, was held by Labor from 1970 until 1984, when Evans won it as an independent Labor candidate. In 1993, he rejoined the Labor Party.

Timeline

Results
The Labor opposition retained the seat despite a small two-party preferred swing.

 Cotton ran under the banner "Independent - Parent Democracy in State Schools".

See also
List of South Australian state by-elections

References

South Australian state by-elections
Elizabeth state by-election
1990s in South Australia
Elizabeth state by-election